Torrance is an unincorporated community in Derry Township, Westmoreland County, Pennsylvania, United States. Torrance has a post office, with ZIP code 15779.

References

Unincorporated communities in Westmoreland County, Pennsylvania
Unincorporated communities in Pennsylvania